Local elections were held in Moldova on 14 June 2015, with a runoff for mayors two weeks later.

Legal context

According to Article 119 of the "Electoral Code" of Moldova, local elected representatives are elected "for a four year term, which begins from the date of conducting local general elections". The previous local election was held in 2011.

References

External links
 Electoral Code of Moldova 
 Election Code of Moldova

2015 in Moldova
Local elections in Moldova
2015 elections in Moldova